The discography of American Latin rap band The Barrio Boyzz consists of seven studio albums, five compilation albums, one holiday album, fourteen singles and four music videos. The Barrio Boyzz was formed in 1991 by Joe Jacket, who proposed creating a mainstream Latino group. They auditioned for chairman of EMI Records, Charles Koppelman, who signed the group to its sister label SBK Records. The group's debut album, Crazy Coolin' (1992), failed to make any impact on music charts, but its lead single "Muy Suavemente" peaked at number 36 on the US Billboard Hot Latin Tracks chart. Their second studio album, Donde Quiera Que Estes (1994) reached the top 20 on Billboards Latin charts. The album spawned three singles; "Cerca De Ti" and "Te Amaré", which peaked at number one and number 16 on the Hot Latin Tracks, respectively. The titular single, a duet with American Tejano pop singer Selena, peaked at number one and was logged atop the Hot Latin Tracks chart for six consecutive weeks.

In 1995, The Barrio Boyzz released their third studio album, Una Vez Más. The recording peaked within the top 15 on the Top Latin Albums and Latin Pop Albums chart. Four singles released from Una Vez Mas; "Eres Asi", "Eres Mi Verdad", "No Me Dejes" and the title track, all reached the top 10 on the Latin Pop Airplay chart. The Barrio Boyzz's released Navidad, Tu y Yo (1995), their first holiday-themed recording, which did not chart. In the same year, How We Roll (1995), an English-language crossover-attempt, failed to acquire any chart success while its two singles; "I Wish" and the song of the same name charted on the Hot R&B/Hip-Hop Singles & Tracks at number 48 and 86, respectively.

The official Latin album of the 1996 Summer Olympics, Voces Unidas (1996), was distributed by EMI Latin and included the Barrio Boyzz recording "Una Nacion", which peaked at number 10 on the Latin Pop Airplay chart. Ven a Mi (1997), the group's fifth studio album, peaked at number nine on the Latin Pop Albums chart and number 23 on the Top Latin Albums chart. The two singles from the album, "Se Me Fue Mi Vida" and "Rico" attained top 20 positions on Latin charts on Billboard magazine.  12 Super Exitos, the second compilation album to be released by the Barrio Boyzz, was released in 1997. The track, "Una Noche De Amor", which was not released as a physical single, hovered the top 10 on the Hot Latin Tracks chart.

After being in hiatus for three years, the Barrio Boyzz released their sixth studio album, Destiny, in 2000 under their label Barrio Soul and Barrio Records. The only single, "Quiero Saber Que Es Amor" peaked at number 40 on the Latin Tropical Airplay chart. This was followed by their third compilation album, Best of the Barrio Boyzz (2000), which did not have chart success. The Barrio Boyzz' final album, Destino (2001), was commercially unsuccessful and soon after its initial release, they disbanded. A number of compilation albums followed without any chart success, Sólo Lo Mejor: 20 Exitos (2002), Latin Classics (2003) and Los Romanticos (2007).

Albums

Studio albums

Compilation albums

Songs

Singles

Other charted songs

Music videos

Notes 
  United States sales figures for "Donde Quiera Que Estés" as of 2000.
  English version.

References

External links
 Boyzz Barrio Boyzz albums discography at Discogs
 Barrio Boyzz albums discography at AllMusic

Discographies of American artists
Latin pop music discographies